The following is a list of indoor arenas in Hungary, ordered by capacity. Halls with a capacity of at least  people are listed.

Arenas in use

Projects 

In italic, sports halls under construction.

See also 
 List of indoor arenas in Europe
 List of indoor arenas by capacity

References 

Indoor arenas in Hungary
Hungary
Indoor arenas